Rugby Clube de Elvas is a rugby team based in Elvas, Portugal. As of the 2012/13 season, they play in the Second Division of the Campeonato Nacional de Rugby (National Championship).

Portuguese rugby union teams